Gozdnica  is a town in Żagań County, Lubusz Voivodeship, Poland, with 3,036 inhabitants (2019).
Voivodeship roads number 300 and 350 are passing through Gozdnica.

Twin towns – sister cities

Gozdnica is twinned with:
 Hähnichen, Germany
 Oldřichov v Hájích, Czech Republic

References

External links
Official town webpage

Cities and towns in Lubusz Voivodeship
Żagań County